Glyphodes vertumnalis is a moth in the family Crambidae. It was described by Achille Guenée in 1854. It is found in India and on Borneo.

Larvae have been recorded feeding on Alstonia scholaris.

References

Moths described in 1854
Glyphodes